Evangeline "Vangie" de Jesus was a Filipino volleyball player who was captain of the Philippines women's national volleyball team. She helped the team clinch the gold medal in the 1977, 1979, and 1981 Southeast Asian Games and was part of the squad that partook in the 1982 Asian Games. She is reputed for her spikes and set delivery and was supported by the Gintong Alay program of the national government.

During her college years, she played for the University of the East Lady Red Warriors, which she later coached from 2007 to 2011 in the UAAP. Along with fellow former player Dulce Pante, De Jesus also worked as Spectator Development Manager in the Philippine Super Liga and was also a physical education instructor.

De Jesus died on November 21, 2020 due to cardiac arrest at the age of 68.

References

University of the East alumni
2020 deaths
1950s births
Philippines women's international volleyball players
Filipino women's volleyball players
Southeast Asian Games medalists in volleyball
Southeast Asian Games gold medalists for the Philippines
Southeast Asian Games competitors for the Philippines
Competitors at the 1981 Southeast Asian Games
Competitors at the 1979 Southeast Asian Games
Competitors at the 1977 Southeast Asian Games
Volleyball players at the 1982 Asian Games
Filipino volleyball coaches
University Athletic Association of the Philippines volleyball players
Asian Games competitors for the Philippines